Keyham may refer to:

 Keyham, Plymouth, a suburb of Plymouth, in Devon, England
 Keyham railway station
 Keyham, Leicestershire, a village and civil parish in Leicestershire, England